İhlas News Agency (IHA) is a Turkish news agency which was founded in 1993, and headquartered in Istanbul, Turkey. At its founding, it was Turkey's first private news agency, as well as the first to provide news through the medium of video. IHA has a large network in Turkey with 85 regional bureaus, according to company website. 

It is part of the Turkish conglomerate İhlas Holding.

References

External links
Company website

Mass media companies established in 1993
Companies based in Istanbul
News agencies based in Turkey